Sheila Fell  (20 July 1931 – 15 December 1979) was an English artist. She was born at Aspatria, Cumberland in 1931. Although she lived in London for the greater part of her life, she devoted her career to painting the Cumberland landscape.

Biography

Early life
Sheila Fell was born into a poor household at Aspatria in 1931, the only child of John (Jack) and Anne Fell. Her father was a coalminer who worked at the Brayton Domain Colliery about a mile and a half from Aspatria. Her mother was a seamstress. By 1936 her father was out of work, but later found work in Whitehaven. Whilst working at another pit in Siddick, some time later, he had both legs crushed in a roof fall. After his convalescence, he returned to work for a year, but then gave up work altogether.

At the age of six Fell contracted diphtheria, but her mother refused to have her admitted to hospital, instead caring for her at home.

Education
After her early education at Richmond Hill School, Aspatria, Fell gained a scholarship allowing her to attend The Nelson Thomlinson School in Wigton, where the teacher responsible for art, Mrs Campbell-Taylor, encouraged her to go to art college. At the age of 16 she enrolled at the Carlisle School of Art (1947–1949), then housed in Tullie House. She later described this experience as a 'dismal disaster'. She explained: "They said I would never make a painter and should do textile design". But she enrolled at Saint Martin's School of Art (1949–1951) where she studied under Roland Vivian Pitchforth and John Napper. She gained her National Diploma in Design at the age of 21, and then stayed on for a further twelve months to complete a post graduate course. Fell augmented the grant received from Cumberland County Council by working in a night club and also at the National Gallery. During her college years she exhibited her work in the Young Contemporaries Show in 1952 and 1953. After leaving college, she worked for a while as a freelance painter during the day, did head modelling, and worked in a café at night.

Career 
In 1955 at the age of 24, she held her first exhibition, becoming the youngest ever artist to exhibit at the Beaux Arts Gallery in Bond Street, London. In December 1955, she appeared on the ten-minute 'Highlight' television programme, which spotlighted the personalities of the day. She joined the teaching staff of Chelsea School of Art in 1958. She would never return to live permanently in Cumberland but its landscape dominated her work for the rest of her life.

That first exhibition in London sold out and brought Fell to the attention of artist L. S. Lowry, who bought two paintings and a drawing, creating a friendship that would last for many years. Lowry gave Fell all the help he could; he advised and encouraged her, and gave financial support by buying around twenty of her paintings and giving her a weekly allowance of £3 and would often visit her when she returned home to Aspatria for her regular holidays. They would go out to the countryside to paint. Lowry got on well with her parents and always called her "Miss Fell", until shortly before his death. 

Although never married, she had a daughter Anna in 1958, by the Greek sculptor Takis Vassilakis.

Style and influences
Sheila Fell used powerful, melancholy oils of living landscape, presided over by huge brooding mountains and dark looming clouds. Colour was always less important than tone, she painted the hills and the seas of the area she loved so well, she painted the earth and those who worked it, depicting rich brown soils, piles of potatoes, small groups of driven cattle, indistinguishable farm buildings and terraced houses running along the streets of Aspatria. Several major artists influenced her style, Cézanne, Constant Permeke, Auerbach and Van Gogh are all evident in parts of her early work.

Death

In December 1979, Hunter Davies began his article for the Sunday Times: "Sheila Fell lives at the top of a long flight of stairs in Chelsea.” He ended it with Fell's own words. "I don't think of myself as a woman artist. Artists are either good or bad. I also intend to live until 104. I've promised myself I will. It's what keeps me going when I worry if I'll ever have time to do all the paintings in my head". However, by the time the article appeared she was already dead. The inquest into her death reported that she had died of alcohol poisoning, on 15 December, at her London flat. She was 48 years of age.

Awards
Fell's first major award came in October 1957 after she entered a painting in the John Moores Painting Prize competition at the Walker Art Gallery, Liverpool. The competition drew 3,000 entries, short listed to 250. Fell, the only female winner, came second in the junior section and picked up a cheque for £250. In 1959, she received a 'Boise' travelling scholarship. Although she travelled extensively throughout Italy, Greece, Switzerland and France the period was not a success. As she told one enquirer: "I have an obsession about Cumberland. I have tried painting in other parts of the world, particularly Greece, but it just doesn't work". In 1967, she was awarded an Arts Council Purchase Award. In 1969 she was elected Associate Member of the Royal Academy  and a full membership five years later.

Exhibitions
1955 Beaux Arts Gallery
1958 Beaux Arts Gallery
1960 Beaux Arts Gallery
1961 The Derwent Centre, Cockermouth
1962 Middlesbrough Art Gallery
1962 Beaux Arts Gallery
1964 Maryport Education Settlement, Cumberland
1964 Beaux Arts Gallery
1965 Abbot Hall Art Gallery, Kendal
1965 Queen Square Gallery, Leeds
1967 Stone Gallery, Newcastle upon Tyne
1969 Stone Gallery, Newcastle upon Tyne
1969 Also exhibited in Arts Council and Contemporary Arts Society touring exhibition
1979 New Grafton Gallery, London
1981 Abbot Hall Art Gallery, Kendal
1981 Salford Art Gallery
2006 Castlegate Gallery, Cockermouth
2011 Abbot Hall Art Gallery, Kendal
2014 Castlegate House Gallery, Cockermouth
2021 Castlegate House Gallery, Cockermouth

Official purchases and public collections
Tate Gallery, London (three paintings)
Contemporary Art Society, London
Walker Art Gallery, Liverpool
Atkinson Art Gallery, Southport
Carlisle Art Gallery
Sunderland Art Gallery
Abbot Hall Art Gallery, Kendal
Laing Art Gallery, Newcastle upon Tyne
Swindon Art Gallery
Huddersfield Art Gallery

Notable paintings
 1955 Aspatria wedding
 1955 Miners
 1958 Farm Land at Aspatria
 1958 Portrait of Anna Fell
 1959 Cumbrian village under snow
 1961 Snowscape IV Tate Gallery collection
 1964 Men working in a cornfield
 1965 Maryport Tate Gallery Collection
 1965 Skiddaw summer
 1967 Haystacks in a field Tate Gallery collection
 1970 Houses in winter
 1979 Potato pick-ing-clouds
 1979 Christmas

References

Further reading
MacDougall, Sarah, （2014), Refiguring the 50s : Joan Eardley, Sheila Fell, Eva Frankfurther, Josef Herman, L S Lowry, Ben Uri Gallery and Museum

External links
 

1931 births
1979 deaths
20th-century English painters
20th-century English women artists
Alumni of Saint Martin's School of Art
Alumni of the University of Cumbria
English women painters
People educated at the Nelson Thomlinson School
People from Aspatria
Royal Academicians